Where Have You Been All My Life may refer to:

 "Where Have You Been (All My Life)", a song written by Barry Mann and Cynthia Weil, first released by Arthur Alexander in 1962 and covered by the Beatles, Gene Vincent, Gerry and the Pacemakers, and the Searchers
 Where Have You Been All My Life?, a 2016 album by Villagers
"Where Have You Been All My Life", a song written by Wayland Holyfield, released as a single in 1978 by Roy Clark
 "Where Have You Been All My Life?", music by Ben Oakland, lyrics by Herb Magidson, from the 1936 film Hats Off
 "Where Have You Been All My Life", a track by Guided by Voices from the 2019 album Zeppelin Over China
 "Where Have You Been All My Life", a track by Perry Farrell from the 2019 album Kind Heaven
 "Where Have You Been All My Life", a track by Ted Nugent from the 1975 album Ted Nugent
 "(Where Have You Been) All My Life"' a track by Double Exposure from the 1979 album Locker Room
 "Where Have You Been All My Life?", a number by Sam Kenyon from the 2018 stage musical Miss Littlewood
 "Where Have You Been All My Life?", a season 1 episode of Passion Cove